Robat-e Namaki (also Romanized as Robāţ-e Namakī and Rubāt-i-Namak; also known as Robāţ) is a village in Robat Rural District, in the Central District of Khorramabad County, Lorestan Province, Iran. At the 2006 census, its population was 606, in 129 families.

References 

Towns and villages in Khorramabad County